The Eternal Conflagration is the fourth full length studio album by the black metal band Abominator. It was released on Displeased Records in 2006. It was re-released on Die Todesrune Records, on LP format in 2007.

Track listing
Mutilate - 4:36
Desecrator of Sanctuary - 5:53
Diabolical Darkness - 5:13
Sarcarium Tormentum - 5:18
Blasphemous Embellishment - 4:22
Tyrants on Your Warpath - 5:25
The Eternal Conflagration - 5:28
Hellfire Armada - 5:49

References

External links
Homepage

[ Release] at Allmusic

2006 albums
Abominator albums